Strangling From Within was released on 23 November 1999 by the Avant-garde metal project Peccatum. The themes on this album can mostly be described as symphonic and neo-classical as well as the more prominent black metal influences.

Female Vocalist Ihriel contributes largely to the operatics and symphonic feel of the album. This is further achieved through use of various classical instruments that feature briefly or that may have a more pronounced role. Namely violins, cellos and harpsichords which are often played during sections of ambience and spoken interludes.

Track listing

 Where Do I Belong - 1:58
 Speak of the Devil (As the Devil May Care) - 5:53
 The Change - 3:01
 The Song Which No Name Carry - 6:35
 The Sand Was Made of Mountains - 3:02
 I Breathe Without Access to Air - 3:50 
 The World of No Worlds - 8:46 
 And Pray for Me - 4:43 
 An Ovation to Art - 5:43

Credits
Ihsahn: Vocals, Keyboards, Strings
Ihriel: Vocals, Keyboards
Lord PZ: Vocals

1999 albums
Peccatum albums